Snow Hill is an unincorporated community in Wilcox County, Alabama, United States.  Snow Hill has one site included on the National Register of Historic Places, the Snow Hill Normal and Industrial Institute.

Snow Hill is referenced in the film Do the Right Thing by the character, Da Mayor, who reminisces about having played a baseball game there in 1939.

Notable people
 Waverley Turner Carmichael, author
 Bill Lee, musician
 Noah Purifoy, artist

References

Unincorporated communities in Alabama
Unincorporated communities in Wilcox County, Alabama